Andrew Brook (born 1943) is a Canadian philosopher.

Andrew Brook may also refer to:
Andrew Zolile T. Brook (1929–2011), South African bishop
Andrew Ten Brook (1814–1899), American academic

See also
Andrew Brooke, English producer and actor
Andrew Brooks (disambiguation)
Brook Andrew (born 1970), Australian artist